World No. 1 Dinara Safina was the defending champion, but she lost in the third round against Zheng Jie.

Flavia Pennetta won in the final 6–4, 6–3 against Samantha Stosur.

Seeds
The top eight seeds receive a bye into the second round.

Main draw

Finals

Top half

Section 1

Section 2

Bottom half

Section 3

Section 4

External links
Draw

LA Women's Tennis Championships - Singles
LA Women's Tennis Championships - Singles
LA Women's Tennis Championships